The OVW Anarchy Championship is a professional wrestling championship owned by the Ohio Valley Wrestling (OVW) promotion. The title was introduced on April 27, 2018 and is a Stipulations Championship, meaning that the current champion can create any stipulation for a match in which they defend. There have been a total of eleven reigns and one vacancy shared between nine different champions. The current champion is Amon who is in his second reign.

Title history

Combined reigns

References

External links
OVW Anarchy Championship History

Ohio Valley Wrestling championships